The following is a list of association football clubs based in Eswatini.

B
Bulembu Young Aces
Bush Bucks FC (Pigg's Peak)

E
Eleven Men in Flight (Siteki)

G
Green Mamba FC (Simunye)

H
Hellenic FC (Mbabane)
Hub Sundowns FC (Manzini)

I
Illovo FC

J
Juventus Kvaluseni FC (Kwaluseni)

M
Malanti Chiefs (Pigg's Peak)
Manchester United FC (Mshingishingini)
Manzini Sea Birds FC
Manzini Sundowns F.C.
Manzini Wanderers
Matsapha United
Mbabane Highlanders
Mbabane Swallows
Mfishane Never Die FC
Mhlambanyatsi Rovers
Mhlume United
Midas City FC
Moneni Pirates FC (Manzini)

N
Nkomazi Sundowns

P
Peacemakers (Mhlume)
Phindrix FC

R
Red Lions FC
Royal Leopards (Simunye)
RSSC United FC (Mhlume)
Russian Bombers FC

T
Tabankulu Callies FC (Mbabane)

U
Umbelebele Jomo Cosmos FC (Mbabane)

V
Vovovo FC

Y
Young Buffaloes FC (Matsapha)

 
Eswatini
Football
Football clubs